The premier gathering of the global space community, the Space Foundation’s Space Symposium (formerly the National Space Symposium) is held each Spring at The Broadmoor resort in Colorado Springs, Colorado.

Attended by top-level representatives from the international space community, the Space Symposium features presentations and panels that provide insight into space developments and the latest thinking on critical industry issues; an expansive exhibit center that showcases the latest space technology; special event and awards presentations: targeted programs for specific groups, including young space professionals, the cyber community and educators and students; and, above all, ample opportunities for networking.

The 2013 event attracted 9,000 total participants from more than 30 nations.

Among the participants were:

 Approximately 160 exhibitors, including 33 that were at the Symposium for the first time
 Almost 100 speakers
 More than 75 teachers from 13 states
 Almost 100 reporters
 More than 370 volunteers from 11 states

Space Foundation Awards 
The Space Foundation annually presents five major awards. at its Space Symposium:The General James E. Hill Lifetime Space Achievement Award; John L. "Jack" Swigert, Jr., Award for Space Exploration; Douglas S. Morrow Public Outreach Award; the Space Achievement Award; and the Alan Shepard Technology in Education Award - in partnership with the Astronauts Memorial Foundation (AMF) and NASA.

References

Space organizations